Alexia Magalhães (born 13 September 2000) is a Luxembourger footballer who plays as a midfielder for Dames Ligue 1 club FCM Young Boys Diekirch and the Luxembourg women's national team.

International career
Magalhães made her senior debut for Luxembourg on 21 June 2019 during a 2–1 friendly win against Andorra.

References

2000 births
Living people
Women's association football midfielders
Luxembourgian women's footballers
Luxembourg women's international footballers
Luxembourgian people of Portuguese descent